Maharao is a variation on the Indian (mainly Hindu) royal title Maharaja, also meaning 'great king' in Hindi. It is composed of Maha- 'great' and the royal title Rao, a variation on Raja.

Ruler title in British India

Salute states (all in present India)
The gun salutes enjoyed by princely states that acceded to the Dominion of India on 14 August 1947, included the following Maharaos:
Hereditary salute of 17-guns (19-guns local): the Maharao of Cutch (=Kachchh =Kutch) 
Hereditary salute of 17-guns: the Maharao of Kotah
Hereditary salute of 17-guns: the Maharao of Bundi

Non-salute states
(probably quite incomplete)
Sirohi (Rao till 1889)

Compound ruler titles
Maharao Raja of Bundi
Maharao  of Alwar till April 1889, since

Other use

Sources
Indian princely states

Indian feudalism
Heads of state
Royal titles
Noble titles
Titles of national or ethnic leadership
Titles in India